Homage to Kindness is a studio album by  David Darling, released on May 10, 2019. The album received a Grammy Award nomination for Best New Age Album.

References

2019 albums
David Darling (musician) albums
New-age albums